The Indian cricket team played one One Day International against Scotland between the conclusion of the Test Series and the beginning of the ODI series against England on August 16, 2007. In what was the first ODI between the two sides, India won the rain-affected match by seven wickets.

Squad lists

Of the players named in the squads, Gordon Drummond (Scotland) and Sourav Ganguly, Zaheer Khan, Rohit Sharma and Sachin Tendulkar (India) did not take part in the match.

One-off ODI

References

2007 in cricket